RFH may refer to:
 Royal Festival Hall, London, UK
 Royal Free Hospital, London, UK
 Rumson-Fair Haven Regional High School, New Jersey, US
 Radio from Hell, a program in Salt Lake City, Utah, US